Sernovodskoye (Ena-Xişka) is a rural locality (a selo) in Sernovodsky District, Chechnya. Population:  The republican balneological resort "Sernovodsk-Kavkazsky" is located in the village.

Administrative and municipal status 
Municipally, Sernovodskoye is incorporated as Sernovodskoye rural settlement. It is the administrative center of the municipality and is the only settlement included in it. It is also the administrative center of the Chechen section of Sunzhensky District, one of the 3 settlements included in the district.

Geography 

Sernovodskoye is located at the foot of the southern slope of the Sunzhensky Ridge.

The nearest settlements to Sernovodskoye are Nagornoye in the north, the city of Sunzha in the west, Assinovskaya in the south, and the villages of Davydenko, Novy Sharoy, and Samashki in the east.

Climate 
The climate of Sernovodskoye is temperate and continental. Winters are moderately mild and there are frequent fogs and some snow cover. The average temperature in January is −4°C. Summers are warm, sometimes with hot and dry weather. The average temperature in July is +25°C. The average annual rainfall is around 500mm and mainly falls between April and October. The average annual humidity is 70%. Wind mainly blows from the east and west.

History 
In 1819, on the site of the modern village, a fortification was built, and in 1846, in honor of the Christian holiday of the Archangel Michael, the Mikhailovsky Church was built. The village was then given the name Mikhailovsky.

In 1920, after the suppression of the anti-Soviet uprising, the entire Cossack population of the village was deported. The deportation was taken in three stages - the first group were sent to Pavlodolskaya on 13 November, the second group were sent to Soldatskaya on 29 November, and the third and final group were sent to Sovetskaya on 3 December. That day, the empty village was handed over to Chechen control. Soon after, it was settled by Chechens and renamed to Aslambek.

From 8 March 1926 to 11 February 1929, it was the administrative center of Novo-Chechensky District, Chechen Autonomous Oblast.

In 1944, after the deportation of the Chechen and Ingush people, the Chechen-Ingush ASSR was abolished, and the village of Aslambek was renamed to Sernovodskoye.

Since the 1970s, the village has also been known as Sernovodsk.

Since 2003, the village has been the administrative center of Sunzhensky District, Chechnya.

Population 

 1970 Census: 7,712
 1979 Census: 8,732
 1990 Census: 8,041
 2002 Census: 9,860
 2010 Census: 10,805
 2019 estimate: 12,048

According to the 2010 Census, the majority of residents of Sernovodskaya (10,736 or 99.34%) were ethnic Chechens with 69 people (0.64%) from other ethnic groups.

References 

Rural localities in Sernovodsky District